Ghetto King is the third studio album by South African singer Zakes Bantwini. It was released on December 3, 2021 by Mayonie Production and Paradise Sound System.  BlaQRhythm, DeeTheGeneral, Drega, Karyendasoul, Khetha, Mthunzi, Nana Atta, Nomkhosi, Skillz, and Skye Wanda appear as guest artists.

Critical reception 
Magnetic Magazine wrote; "Ghetto King is a long and sometimes slow burn, but the payoffs are worth it".

Commercial performance 
In late January 2022, Ghetto King surpassed 50 million streams.

Industry awards 
Ghetto King received 4 nominations for Best Dance Album, Best Engineered Album of the Year, Album of the Year, Male  Artist of the Year at the 28th ceremony of South African Music Awards.

!
|-
|rowspan="4"|2022
|rowspan="4"|Ghetto King
|Best Dance Album 
| 
|rowspan="4"|
|-
|Album of the Year 
|
|-
|Best Engineered Album of the Year 
|
|-
|Male Artist of the Year
|

Track listing

Personnel 
All credits adapted from AllMusic.

 Amanda Benedicta Anthony - Composer, Primary Artist
 Nana Atta - Composer, Primary Artist
 Zakhele Madida - Musical Producer, Primary Artist, Producer, Composer
 BlaQRhythm - Musical Producer, Primary Artist, Producer
 Nicodimus Mogashoa - Producer, Remix Engineer, Composer
 DeeTheGeneral - Primary Artist
 Ega - Musical Producer, Primary Artist, Producer
 Kasmario Ike Fankis - Composer, Producer
 Karyendasoul - Composer, Producer, Primary Artist, Producer
 Kasango - Primary Artist
 Olefied Khetha - Primary Artist
 Nomkhosi Mazibuko - Composer
 Zwakale Mdletshe - Composer
 Nonhle Aretha Mhlongo - Composer
 Sinenhlanhla Mthembu - Composer
 Mthunzi - Primary Artist, Composer
 Nomkhosi - Primary Artist
 Skillz - Musical Producer, Primary Artist, Producer
 Skye Wanda - Primary Artist
 Khethukuthula Tonny Yalo - Composer
 Mbuso Zindela - Composer
 Yanga Mzikhulu Zodala - Composer
 Nkosinathi Zungu - Composer

Release 
"Osama" was released as the album's lead single on September 10, 2021. The song peaked at number one on Radio Monitor Charts.

Release history

References 

2021 albums